The 1978 Angelo State Rams football team was an American football team that represented Angelo State University and won the national championship during the 1978 NAIA Division I football season. In their fifth season under head coach Jim Hess, the Rams compiled a perfect 14–0 record.

Schedule

References

Angelo State
Angelo State Rams football seasons
Lone Star Conference football champion seasons
NAIA Football National Champions
Angelo State Rams football
College football undefeated seasons